The United States ambassador to Argentina is the official representative of the president of the United States to the head of state of Argentina.

Argentina had declared its independence from Spain in 1816 and there followed a series of revolutionary wars until 1861 when the nation was united. The United States recognized the government of Buenos Aires, the predecessor to Argentina, on January 27, 1823. Caesar Augustus Rodney was appointed as American Minister Plenipotentiary to Buenos Aires. Between 1854 and 1866, U.S. ambassadors were commissioned to the Argentine Confederation. Since 1867, ambassadors have been commissioned to the Argentine Republic.

Diplomatic relations between the U.S. and Argentina were interrupted but not severed in June 1944 when the U.S. government recalled its ambassador in a dispute with the newly appointed dictator Edelmiro Julián Farrell. The U.S. government believed that Farrell was not committed to the defense of the Western Hemisphere against the Axis powers. Normal relations were resumed with the appointment of a new ambassador in April 1945 when Argentina declared war against Germany.

The official residence of the U.S. Ambassador in Buenos Aires is the Bosch Palace, listed on the State Department's Register of Culturally Significant Property.

Ambassadors and chiefs of mission

Notes

See also
Argentina – United States relations
Foreign relations of Argentina
Ambassadors of the United States

References
United States Department of State: Background notes on Argentina

External links
United States Department of State: Chiefs of Mission for Argentina
United States Department of State: Argentina
United States Embassy in Buenos Aires

Argentina

United States